The 1908–09 season was the 14th competitive season in Belgian football.

Overview
At the end of the season RC Gantois was relegated to the second division and replaced by Standard FC Liégeois.

National team

* Belgium score given first

Key
 H = Home match
 A = Away match
 N = Match on neutral ground
 F = Friendly
 o.g. = own goal

Honours

Final league tables

Division I

Promotion
In the first stage of the Promotion, 5 provincial leagues were played, with 9 clubs qualifying for the final round:
 For Antwerp, RC de Malines (winner) and AS Anversoise (runner-up)
 For West and East Flanders, AA La Gantoise (winner) and FC Brugeois II (runner-up)
 For Liège, Standard FC Liégeois (winner) and SC de Theux (runner-up)
 For Brabant, Athletic and Running Club de Bruxelles (winner) and Daring Club de Bruxelles II (runner-up)
 For Hainaut and Namur, CS Montois (winner)

External links
RSSSF archive - Final tables 1895-2002
Belgian clubs history

References